"Sweeter Than You" is a song written by Baker Knight and performed by Ricky Nelson. The song reached #9 on the Billboard Hot 100 and #19 in the UK Singles Chart in 1959. The song was featured on his 1959 album, Songs by Ricky.

The song is ranked #83 on Billboard magazine's Top 100 songs of 1959.

Other versions
 The Four Pennies released a version as part of an EP in the United Kingdom in 1965.
 Crippled Black Phoenix released a version as the opener to their album "White Light Generator" in 2014

In media
 Nelson's version was featured on season 1, episode 14 of the show Cold Case entitled "The Boy in the Box".

References

1959 songs
1959 singles
Songs written by Baker Knight
Ricky Nelson songs
Imperial Records singles